The 2015 Colonia Cup was a summer football friendly tournament organized by German club 1. FC Köln and hosted at the RheinEnergieStadion in Cologne, from 1 to 2 August 2015. Besides the hosts, three other European teams took part: Porto (Portugal), Valencia (Spain), and Stoke City (England).

The tournament consisted of four matches (two matches per day), with wins being awarded three points and losses awarded zero points. In case of a draw at the end of 90 minutes of play, a penalty shoot-out would take place to determine the winners. Additionally, each goal scored was rewarded with a point, regardless of the match outcome (penalty shoot-out goals did not count).

Standings

Matches

References

External links 

2015–16 in German football
2015–16 in English football
2015–16 in Spanish football
2015–16 in Portuguese football